Nathan Truesdell is an Academy Award nominated independent filmmaker. He is best known for his work on the documentary films Balloonfest, Ascension, and The Water Slide.

Life and career
Truesdell comes from Clark, Missouri where he spent the first 18 years of his life.  He then realized the practicality of college and attended the University of Missouri.  He obtained his degree in computer science with a minor in mathematics.  Nate comes from the DIY school of filmmaking.

Truesdell has worked with many award-winning and well-regarded documentary filmmakers.
His second documentary short film Balloonfest, premiered at American Film Institute and San Francisco International Film Festival. His documentary short film The Water Slide, premiered at American Film Institute and San Francisco International Film Festival.

In 2021, Truesdell produced and photographed Ascension, which went on to be nominated for the Academy Award for Best Documentary Feature Film at the 94th Academy Awards.

Personal life
Truesdell is married to filmmaker Jessica Kingdon.

Filmography
As Director
 2020 - It's Coming!
 2019 - Lightning vs. Thunder
 2019 - The Art of Making Money
 2018 - The Water Slide
 2017 - Balloonfest
 2014 - Time to Talk About Jobs
 2011 - Cinema Eye Honors
As Cinematographer
 
 2021 - Ascension
 2020 - It's Coming!
 2019 - Landing on Airwaves
 2019 - The Art of Making Money
 2017 - Chasing AllieCat
 2017 - The Experimental City
 2016 - Primaries
 2016 - Speaking Is Difficult
 2015 - Deprogrammed
 2015 - Killing Them Safely
 2014 - PFlat Black
 2014 - Midterms
 2013 - Caucus
 2013 - We Always Lie to Strangers
 2013 - Threshold
 2013 - Dear Valued Guests
 2012 - X-Ray Man
 2012 - The Body of Richard Baker
 2011 - Light the Water
 2011 - Red Cloud
 2011 - Lost & Found
 2011 - Cinema Eye Honors
 2010 - Big Birding Day
 2009 - Real Super Heroes: Real Vigilantes
 2009 - Convention
 2007 - Steppin' Frat
 2006 - Wrastlin
 2006 - Midwest Muslim
 2006 - Bio-Town

As Editor
 
 2020 - It's Coming!
 2019 - Lightning vs. Thunder
 2019 - The Art of Making Money
 2018 - The Water Slide
 2017 - Balloonfest
 2015 - Killing Them Safely
 2014 - Time to Talk About Jobs
 2012 - X-Ray Man
 2011 - Cinema Eye Honors
 2010 - Big Birding Day
 2009 - Convention
 2007 - Steppin' Frat
 2006 - Wrastlin
 2006 - Midwest Muslim
 2006 - Bio-Town

As Producer
 
 2021 - Ascension
 2020 - It's Coming!
 2019 - Lightning vs. Thunder
 2019 - 8:08 - How We Respond
 2019 - The Art of Making Money
 2018 - How We Respond
 2018 - The Gospel of Eureka
 2017 - Balloonfest
 2016 - Primaries
 2016 - Peace in the Valley
 2013 - Caucus
 2013 - We Always Lie to Strangers
 2013 - Dear Valued Guests
 2012 - The Body of Richard Baker
 2011 - Cinema Eye Honors
 2009 - Convention
 2005 - Song of the Dead

Awards and nominations

References

External links

Man behind award-winning Cleveland 'Balloonfest' documentary just really wants you to like his film

Film directors from Missouri
People from Randolph County, Missouri
Living people
Year of birth missing (living people)